Algo Kärp (born 13 April 1985 in Tarvastu) is a former Estonian cross-country skier who competed from 2004 to 2018. His best World Cup finish was 16th in a 50km event in 2014 Oslo, Norway. He represented Estonia at the 2010, 2014 and 2018 Winter Olympics. 

On 5 March 2019 Kärp confessed that, since 2016, he and Karel Tammjärv had used blood doping assisted by German sports doctor . He admitted that he wasn't aware of the third Estonian in the doping scandal, Andreas Veerpalu, using blood doping.

Cross-country skiing results
All results are sourced from the International Ski Federation (FIS).

Olympic Games

World Championships

References

External links
 
 
 
 

1985 births
Living people
People from Viljandi Parish
Cross-country skiers at the 2010 Winter Olympics
Cross-country skiers at the 2014 Winter Olympics
Cross-country skiers at the 2018 Winter Olympics
Estonian male cross-country skiers
Estonian sportspeople in doping cases
Tour de Ski skiers
Olympic cross-country skiers of Estonia
Doping cases in cross-country skiing
21st-century Estonian people